The 1972 River Oaks Tennis Tournament, also known as the River Oaks Invitational, was a men's tennis tournament played on outdoor clay courts at the River Oaks Country Club in Houston, Texas, U.S. in the United States. It was the 38th edition of the tournament and was held from April 3 through April 9, 1972. The tournament was part of the 1972 World Championship Tennis circuit and offered total prize money of $50,000. The singles title was won by first-seeded Rod Laver who earned $10,000 first-prize money.

Finals

Singles

 Rod Laver defeated  Ken Rosewall 6–2, 6–4

Doubles

 Roy Emerson /  Rod Laver defeated  Ken Rosewall /  Fred Stolle 6–3, 6–3

See also
 Laver–Rosewall rivalry

References

External links
 ITF tournament edition details

Louisville Open
River Oaks Tennis Tournament
River Oaks Tennis Tournament
River Oaks Tennis Tournament